Rudolf Marro (born 15 August 1953) is a Swiss wrestler. He competed in the men's freestyle 74 kg at the 1980 Summer Olympics.

References

External links
 
 His wrestling club 
 Marro Rudolf profil on swissolympians 

1953 births
Living people
Swiss male sport wrestlers
Olympic wrestlers of Switzerland
Wrestlers at the 1980 Summer Olympics
Sportspeople from the canton of Fribourg